Kirkconnel Tower was a 16th-century tower house, about  east of Ecclefechan, Dumfries and Galloway, Scotland, south of Kirtle Water, south of Kirkconnel Church.

It is different from Kirkconnel House, south of Dumfries.

History
This is thought to have been the home of Helen of Kirconnel, the subject of the ballad published by Walter Scott, in Minstrelsy of the Scottish Border.
It may have been a mansion of the Irving family.

Structure
There is no trace of the castle nor evidence of its structure.

See also
Castles in Great Britain and Ireland
List of castles in Scotland

References

Castles in Dumfries and Galloway